Maryam Mohammed Khalfan Al Roumi (born 2 February 1957) is an Emirati woman politician, who has been serving as the minister of social affairs since February 2006. She is the second woman who holds a cabinet post in the United Arab Emirates, and one of two women in the cabinet.

Early life and education
Roumi was born on 2 February 1957. She received a bachelor's degree in English literature from the United Arab Emirates University in 1980.

Career
Roumi was a research assistant at her alma mater, UAE University, from March 1983 to August 1983. She served as the chairman of the UAE special olympics from 1989 to 1994. She also served as the chairman of the higher advisory committee for the women higher colleges of technology in Abu Dhabi from 1990 to 1994. Then she became the director of Abu Dhabi's handicapped rehabilitation center and of center for special needs at the ministry of labor and social affairs where she served from April 1984 to February 1999. She served as the undersecretary of the ministry of labour and social affairs from February 1999 to February 2006. She was appointed minister of social affairs to the cabinet headed by prime minister Mohammed bin Rashid Al Maktoum on 9 February 2006. She retained her post in the reshuffle of May 2009.

Awards
Roumi holds an honorary doctorate from the University of Middlesex Dubai which was given in December 2009.

References

1957 births
Living people
Government ministers of the United Arab Emirates
United Arab Emirates University alumni
Women government ministers of the United Arab Emirates